is a Japanese manga series, written and illustrated by the duo Maybe. It was published by Square Enix and serialized in the Monthly Gangan Joker magazine. An anime adaptation by Silver Link aired between April and June 2012. It has been licensed by Sentai Filmworks in North America.

Synopsis

Setting
The story takes place at Seikyou Private Academy: an extremely old school with several buildings, each built at different points in history without care for the existing architecture. Many of them overlap and mix with each other, resulting in an unintentional maze-like structure, within which the untrained can easily lose their way. The School was built over an old shrine, which is where Yuuko died. Since her body and regrets are tied to the school, she is unable to leave the school grounds even if she wanted to. In the series, a 'Ghost' is formed from the person's regrets while they were alive. One can see them only if believing in the ghost's existence - but depending on one's expectations and knowledge, what they see will vary greatly: from Yuuko's true form (as she sees herself and was before she died) to a demonic entity.

Plot

Manga
The story revolves around a first-year middle school student, Teiichi Niiya who had just enrolled at Seikyou Private Academy. When he gets lost in one of the school's old buildings, he meets a girl named Yuuko Kanoe who reveals herself as a ghost with no memories. Teiichi then decides to investigate her death by looking through the school's seven mysteries revolving around her. Throughout the story, Teiichi and Yuuko discover the truth about these ghost stories while helping those who are troubled. It is discovered that Yuuko has no memories as she forced her entire reason for existing into another dark form referred to as "Shadow Yuuko". If she can accept this part of her, she can remember why she still is trapped as a ghost, i.e. her final wish.

When they discover 6 of the seven mysteries, Yuuko's sister (now, an old woman) reveals that there were only ever 6: the Seventh one mystery never existed. At this point Yuuko decides to accept her shadow half and she tells Teiichi her reason for remaining on earth; 60 years ago there was a plague in the town. According to popular belief, the plague was caused by the gods as The Kanoe family who was supposed to perform a certain ritual for the gods, had neglected their duties. Due to this the townspeople became very antagonistic towards the Kanoe family. Also the only way to lift this curse was for Yuuko's father, the Priest at the time, to sacrifice that who was closest to him which was one of his daughters. To avoid choosing, he planned on leaving the town for a time. However, Yuuko's sister was so influenced by the people, she believed them to be right. So, with a group of people, Yuuko's sister pretended as if she was kidnapped for the sacrifice and lured Yuuko back to the school (under the school was the shrine which could be accessed through a secret door). There, they performed the ritual and threw Yuuko down to the shrine and to prevent her from escaping, they broke one of her legs and nailed the door shut. Only after the ritual did the people, including her sister, realize what they had done, but they did not repent and left her there to die. Initially only scared and sad, Yuuko began to slowly die due to lack of food, water and her injury. Finally in anger, she demanded that if she was a sacrifice then the gods should grant her last request which that all those related to her murder would die. Following this, all those except her sister died from the plague or insanity, seemingly in response to Yuuko's dying wish. However, the plague did not vanish after the ritual. In despair her father committed suicide and out of regret, her sister opened the door only to find Yuuko's corpse. But Yuuko's ghost then attacked her sister but could not bring herself to kill her. She ran away and in her sadness, tore away that part of herself.

After telling Teiichi this Yuuko forgives her sister and all those who killed her and loses all regrets and begins to move on but at the last second realizes she wants to be with Teiichi but vanishes. Teiichi becomes forlorn as once she vanishes the old school building under which her body is located is demolished and people begin to forget about the 'Yuuko-san' rumors. So he creates a new set of stories about how the 6 'seven' mysteries are actually tales of her past, how she was consumed with hate but forgave everyone and how she is now a guardian of the school protecting everyone. He believes that he became a regret for her so at the last second she stopped passing on but is now trapped in a weakened form as her base; the old school building and her body has been removed. So he started the new rumors to give her a new base. He then hears a new rumor, about how Yuuko was always looking for someone to be with her and she found a boy who fell in love with her and she with him, so they swore to be together and then the boy disappears from the school forever with Yuuko. Teiichi runs out of the school and sees Yuuko waiting for him and they embrace. In the end the two girls discussing the rumor are discussing whether Yuuko took him to the other side or not but they decide that this mystery has a happy ending and it is declared that this is the Seventh Mystery of Yuuko-san.

In the epilogue it is shown that Yuuko is with Teiichi in school and the Paranormal Investigation club is being restarted. Since Teiichi is her new regret, she is now bound to him, and not the school. At the end of the manga, Yuuko takes Teiichi to another part of the old school building, where she comes out to him wearing a wedding dress. Wanting the two of them to do something together and being as he is the only person to see her (besides Kirie), Yuuko confesses that she wants to be with Teiichi forever. Teiichi states that he was glad to be "possessed" by a wonderful ghost and was happy that Yuuko was the first person he fell in love with. Yuuko then jumps on top of Teiichi and kisses him. Yuuko then says "Let's go to Heaven together!" with a smile on her face.

Anime
The anime follows a slightly different story: Teiichi initially begins to help Yuuko, as he does in the manga. There is only little talk of the Seven Mysteries and never in a central light. However, as Kirie and Okonogi get closer to him, Yuuko begins to develop jealousy. Unbeknownst to anyone at the time, she cannot harbour negative feelings and as a result, she shifts them and the memories associated with them to "Shadow-Yuuko", who like in the manga, was already holding Yuuko's grudge against those who sacrificed her.

Teiichi succeeds at getting Yuuko's memories of himself back and from there, he helps her remember her past. A new character is introduced into Yuuko's past here; A young girl, referred to as Asa-chan. Asa was initially a dark and gloomy young girl, since most of her family had died from the plague and she expected to die soon as well. She generally rebuffed Yuuko's attempts of friendship, fearing that she'd pass the plague to Yuuko, but they gradually became closer.

Yuuko is later lured into the trap by the townspeople believing that Asa is going to be sacrificed. In actuality, Asa is forced into the role of Akahito-sama, a messenger of gods, who is to choose a sacrifice. As Yuuko arrives, Asa calls out her name in fear, and the villagers take it as Yuuko being chosen. Her injury is not caused by the villagers, but rather by being thrown down the stairs to the shrine and her sister had no involvement with her death; in fact, she earlier rebuffed Yuuko for having ideas of sacrificing herself.

Teiichi initially learns the past himself, which results in Yuuko being unable to see or hear him, until he talks to Shadow-Yuuko and reconciles the two as the same person. He reveals that he learned, from Yuuko's sister, that Asa is his grandmother, and that Yuuko's sacrifice was not in vain, as it allowed them to meet. 
From here, the Anime ends in a similar way; Yuuko begins to vanish since her regrets are now gone. She spends a final day with Teiichi, that culminates in a sorrowful kiss. Kirie briefly teases Teiichi, even though she knows that she cannot replace Yuuko. However, it is revealed that Teiichi's kiss, filled Yuuko with regret, that kept her bound to him, as a new final regret and that she is now bound to him forever.

Characters
 

 Teiichi joins the Paranormal Investigations club made by Yuuko in order to find more information about Yuuko's death. He gets easily flustered when Yuuko teases him. As he interacts with Yuuko, the two of them eventually fall in love with each other.
 

 Mainly known as "Yuuko-san" from the ghost stories in the school, she is the infamous ghost of Seikyou Academy and the President of the Paranormal Investigations club. She is cheerful and enjoys tricking people, but gets very jealous and angry when a girl tries to get close to Teiichi to the point of almost causing injury at times. She is flirtatious towards Teiichi, often teasing him and does not mind to have her "body" being seen by him, except her skeleton (since it is the peak of her nakedness). The various ghost stories of the school are all related to Yuuko in some ways. She is in love with Teiichi.
 

 A member of the Paranormal Investigations Club. She is indebted to Teiichi for saving her from the Underground demon legend (which was fabricated by Yuuko) and looks for many ghost stories in the school to help the club. She is the only member of the club that cannot see Yuuko despite learning of her existences but despite it all, she believes that the other two can see Yuuko. She in fact, saw Yuuko before but she saw only the Underground demon legend since Yuuko can seen by anyone aware of her but their perception changes with their awareness. Okonogi had heard of the legend and then became aware hence she saw her on that form. When Teiichi "killed" the demon she could not see Yuuko in any form. She admires Teiichi and likes him.
 

 A member of Paranormal Investigations club and Yuuko's grandniece. She is the only character other than Teiichi and her own grandmother to be able to see Yuuko. She originally believed that Yuuko was an evil spirit until she learns the truth: that she was seeing Shadow Yuuko. Kirie resembles Yuuko albeit with short hair and a smaller bust as her grandmother is Yuuko's younger sister. She has some feelings for Teiichi, however she cannot confess them but tries to in ways such as suggesting that if need be she could replace Yuuko for Teiichi if she grew out her hair. She is easily frightened especially of ghosts except for Yuuko.

Media

Manga
The manga began serialization in Monthly Gangan Joker on April 22, 2009, and ended on June 22, 2013, with the July issue of the magazine. Ten compiled volumes have been released between August 22, 2009, and November 22, 2013. Additionally a volume 8.5 "Official Guidebook" and an anthology by several authors were published on November 22, 2012.

Drama CD
A drama CD of the manga was published by Frontier Works and released on July 22, 2010.

Anime
An anime adaptation by Silver Link was announced in the January issue of Square Enix's Monthly Gangan Joker and aired in Japan between April and June 2012 with 12 episodes with a 13th episode included in the 6th DVD and Blu-ray Disk volumes. It was also simulcasted by Crunchyroll. In episode 12 the insert song is "Requiem" by Nao Hiiragi. The anime has been licensed by Sentai Filmworks in North America and released a dubbed version of the anime on DVD and Blu-ray Disc on June 4, 2013. MVM Films have licensed the anime for the United Kingdom for release on DVD on February 10, 2014.

Reception
Rebecca Silverman of Anime News Network (ANN) reviewed the first half of the series in 2012. Despite finding Momoe Okonogi a nuisance for ruining some of the show's dramatic moments, she praised the different art styles used throughout the episodes and the various supernatural elements that carry an atmospheric tone, saying that "On the whole, Dusk maiden of Amnesia is greater than the sum of its parts." Fellow ANN editor Theron Martin reviewed the complete anime series in 2013. While finding problems with the plot wrapping up too quickly and some minor artistic flubs, Martin praised the series for melding different genre elements seamlessly, its mood-setting musical score and its handling of the main cast, saying that "In all, the anime adaptation of Dusk maiden of Amnesia is a good example of economy of action." Allen Moody from THEM Anime Reviews was at arms length with the series at first with its harem elements and "gratuitous fanservice", but came to appreciate the supernatural horror aesthetics used throughout the scenes and the female cast for having distinguished artwork and character development, concluding that: "Overall, this is not a great series, but it is often an interesting one, and the ladies are only occasionally required to surrender their dignity, for which I am very grateful."

See also
To the Abandoned Sacred Beasts, another manga series with the same creator
Tales of Wedding Rings, another manga series with the same creator

References

External links
Official Square Enix website
Official Anime website

2009 manga
2012 anime television series debuts
Gangan Comics manga
Mystery anime and manga
Romance anime and manga
School life in anime and manga
Sentai Filmworks
Shōnen manga
Silver Link
Supernatural anime and manga
Tokyo MX original programming